Jönköpings IK is a floorball club in Jönköping, Sweden, established on 9 March 1985 following a merger of the SMU Immanuel Church and the Munksjö School teams. The men's team has played several seasons in the Swedish top division and lost the Swedish national finals in 1986, 1988, and 1990 while earning the national championship bronze medals in 1987, 1989, and 1991.

Roster 
As of August 27, 2020

References

External links
Official website 

1985 establishments in Sweden
Sport in Jönköping
Swedish floorball teams
Sports clubs established in 1985